The canton of Pleslin-Trigavou is an administrative division of the Côtes-d'Armor department, northwestern France. It was created at the French canton reorganisation which came into effect in March 2015. Its seat is in Pleslin-Trigavou.

It consists of the following communes:
 
Beaussais-sur-Mer
Lancieux
Langrolay-sur-Rance
Pleslin-Trigavou
Plouër-sur-Rance
Saint-Samson-sur-Rance
Taden
Tréméreuc
La Vicomté-sur-Rance

References

Cantons of Côtes-d'Armor